Francisco de Gamboa, O.S.A. (21 March 1599 – 22 May 1674) was a Roman Catholic prelate who served as Archbishop of Zaragoza (1663–1674) and Bishop of Coria (1659–1663).

Biography
Francisco de Gamboa was born in San Sebastián, Spain on 21 March 1599 and ordained a priest in the Order of Saint Augustine. On 5 July 1659, he was selected by the King of Spain and confirmed by Pope Alexander VII on 10 November 1659 as Bishop of Coria. In 1660, he was consecrated bishop by Diego Arce Reinoso, Bishop Emeritus of Plasencia. On 2 July 1663, he was appointed during the papacy of Pope Alexander VII as Archbishop of Zaragoza. He served as Archbishop of Zaragoza until his death on 22 May 1674. While bishop, he was the principal consecrator of Francisco López de Urraca, Bishop of Bosa (1672).

References

External links and additional sources
 (for Chronology of Bishops) 
 (for Chronology of Bishops) 
 (for Chronology of Bishops) 
 (for Chronology of Bishops) 

17th-century Roman Catholic bishops in Spain
Bishops appointed by Pope Alexander VII
1599 births
1674 deaths
People from San Sebastián
Augustinian bishops